Michael  Adam Gerber Stocker is an American philosopher and Irwin & Marjorie Guttag Professor of Ethics and Political Philosophy at Syracuse University.  He is known for his works on ethics. Stocker is the author of the seminal paper The Schizophrenia of Modern Ethical Theories.

Education 
He earned his B.A. from Columbia College, where he was a student of Sidney Morgenbesser, and Ph.D. (1966) from Harvard University, where he wrote his dissertation on supererogation under the direction of John Rawls.

Works

Books
 Plural and Conflicting Values, Oxford: Oxford University Press 1990, reprinted 1992 
 Valuing Emotions (with Elizabeth Hegeman), New York: Cambridge University Press, 1996

Select articles, book chapters (co-)authored

"Act and Agent Evaluations." The Review of Metaphysics, Volume 27, Issue 1, September 1973, pp. 42-61.
"The Schizophrenia of Modern Ethical Theories." The Journal of Philosophy, Vol. 73, No. 14, August 1976, pp. 453-466 
"Desiring the bad: An essay in moral psychology." The Journal of Philosophy, Vol. 76, Issue 12, December 1979, pp. 747-765
"Values and Purposes: The Limits of Teleology and the Ends of Friendship." The Journal of Philosophy, Vol. 78, No. 12, December 1981, pp. 747-765
"Responsibility Especially for Beliefs." Mind, Vol. XCI, Issue 363, July 1982, pp. 398–417.
"Dirty Hands and Conflicts of Values and of Desires in Aristotle's Ethics." Pacific Philosophical Quarterly, Vol. 67, 1986, pp. 36–61.

References

21st-century American philosophers
Political philosophers
Kant scholars
Philosophy academics
Syracuse University faculty
Harvard University alumni
Academic staff of La Trobe University
Fellows of the Australian Academy of the Humanities
Year of birth missing (living people)
Living people